Nurgyul Salimova (born 2 June 2003) is a Bulgarian chess player. She was awarded the titles of International Master and Woman Grandmaster by FIDE in 2019. Salimova won the Bulgarian women's championship in 2017. In 2023, she won the silver medal in her country’s national chess championship and was the only woman to compete in the open section.

Biography
Salimova was born in the village of   Krepcha (Targovishte Province). She learnt to play chess at the age of four. In 2011, in Albena she won the European Youth Chess Championship for girls under 8. In 2015, in Porto Carras Salimova won the World Youth Chess Championship for girls under 12. In 2015, she also won European Union Youth Chess Championship for girls under 12. She is a multiple winner of Bulgarian and European Youth Chess Championships in fast and blitz chess for girls in different age groups.

Salimova won the Bulgarian Women's Chess Championship in 2017.
In 2018 Salimova was invited to play in one of the strongest tournaments ever - Tata Steel group C.
In April 2018 Salimova became Bulgarian champion in the section G16 and 2 days later, Bulgarian blitz champion in the boys' section under 16.
In May 2018, Nurgyul Salimova won the Bayonne open with a performance of 2600+, enough for a GM norm.
In July 2018, Salimova scored her last WIM, first IM and first WGM norm at Pardubice, Czech Republic with a performance of 2478. Thanks to that, her rating went up to 2352 and she became the #2 in the under 16 girls world rankings, #2 among Bulgarian women and #11 in the world list for girls under 20. In September she took part in the Serbian women league with the team of ‘’Banovci Dunav’’. Salimova played at the second board and scored 8/10 (without losses) with a performance of 2400+. This gave her a second WGM norm. The team did poorly and finished in last place.

Salimova scored her last WGM and second IM norm in December 2018 at the age of 15 in Zadar, Croatia with a performance of 2492.   
In April 2019, at the European Women's Individual Chess Championships, Salimova scored her last (valid) WGM norm and became a WGM at the age of 15 years and 10 months. She also earned the right to participate in the Women's World Cup.

In January 2022, at Vergani Cup January edition, Salimova got her first GM norm after defeating the former world championship challenger GM Nigel Short.

In the 2023 Bulgarian Chess Championships, she ended half a point short of first place. Although she tied for second place with two others (both GMs), Salimova was awarded the silver medal because her tiebreak points were higher. In the tournament, she finished ahead of six GMs and lost only to the champion, the national legend GM Georgiev Kiril. The nine-round Swiss tournament was held January 21-28, 2023 in Sofia, Bulgaria.

References

External links

Nurgyul Salimova chess games at 365Chess.com

2003 births
Living people
Chess International Masters
Chess woman grandmasters
People from Targovishte Province
Bulgarian female chess players
World Youth Chess Champions